USS Ely has been the name of more than one United States Navy ship, and may refer to:

 , a destroyer escort launched in 1944 but cancelled prior to completion
 , a patrol craft renamed USS Ely (PCE-880) on 15 February 1956

United States Navy ship names